Lee Chan-won (Korean: 이찬원, born 1 November 1996) is a South Korean celebrity and singer. He is one of the top 7 of Mr. Trot in 2020. He is nicknamed Chantobaegi (Korean: 찬또배기) for singing Jintobaegi by Lee Sung-woo during Mr. Trot.

Lee graduated from Kyungwon High School, where he used to be an emcee of school events. One of his teacher had requested him to sing Day of Dawn by Song Dae-kwan during the episode 2 of Romantic Call Centre on 9 April 2020. 5 days later, he made a contract with Bliss Entertainment.

Philanthropy 
In July 2022, Lee donated 1.5 million won as prize money for the June Good Han Star singing competition, to patients with childhood cancer Leukemia and rare incurable diseases.

On September 5, 2022, Lee donated 1.5 million won to Good Han Star August for childhood cancer patients, Leukemia and incurable diseases.

On October 5, 2022, Lee donated 2 million won to Good Han Star September for childhood cancer patients, Leukemia and incurable diseases.

In November 2022, Lee donated 2 million won as prize money for the October Good Han Star singing competition after last month to support the costs of outpatient treatment for children Pediatric cancer and leukemia.

In December 2022, Lee donated 1.5 million won to Sunhan Star Gawangjeon in November, To support the cost of treatment for children suffering from childhood cancer and leukemia.

On January 5, 2023, Lee donated 1.5 million won to Good Star Gawangjeon.

Discography

Studio albums

Extended plays

Singles

Other charted songs

Soundtrack appearances

Filmography

Television shows

Web shows

Radio

Commercial

Hosting

Concert 
 ONE DAY (2023)

Awards and nominations

References

External links 
 Lee Chan-won on YouTube

1996 births
Living people
South Korean male singers
Trot singers
People from Ulsan
People from Daegu
Mr Trot participants